North Korea Intellectuals Solidarity is a group of North Korean dissidents resident in South Korea.

It was founded by Kim Heung Kwang in October 2008.

Overview
NKIS's mission is to promote freedom, democratization, reform, and human rights for North Korea. Its activities include:

Conducting academic research on North Korea and unification
Researching ideas on the development and progression of North Korea
Cultivating the skills of North Korean defector intellectuals and fostering younger generations

The organization has also been known to smuggle in USB drives containing political information about South Korean governmental activities along with DVDs and other South Korean media content.

See also

Fighters for a Free North Korea
North Korean People's Liberation Front
Rimjin-Gang

References

External links
Homepage (Korean) 
Homepage (English)
Facebook Page

Dissidents
Political activism